Średnie Wielkie  (Serednie Velyke) is a village in the administrative district of Gmina Zagórz, within Sanok County, Subcarpathian Voivodeship, in south-eastern Poland.

References

Villages in Sanok County